Burcu Bircan (born June 14, 1988) is a Turkish volleyball player. She is 186 cm and plays as outside hitter. Burcu plays for Yeşil Bayamiçspor.

Career
Bircan played for Galatasaray Medical Park in the 2009/10 season. She then played in 2010 for Çanakkale Belediye For the 2014/15 she played for Salihli Belediyespor. and for Yeşil Bayamiçspor for the 2015/16 season.

See also
 Turkish women in sports

References

1988 births
Living people
Turkish women's volleyball players
Galatasaray S.K. (women's volleyball) players
20th-century Turkish sportswomen
21st-century Turkish sportswomen